is a  town located in Sorachi Subprefecture, Hokkaido, Japan.

As of September 2016, the town has an estimated population of 3,429. The total area is 151.05 km2.

History

The town's name originates from the first warden of Kabato Prison, located in Tsukigata, Kiyoshi Tsukigata.
 1881: Kabato Prison established. First warden: Kiyoshi Tsukigata. Tsukigata village established.
 1899: Urausu village (Now, Urausu town) established as a separate entity from Tsukigata town.
 1953: Tsukigata village becomes Tsukigata town.
 1981: Tsukigata town's 100 year anniversary.
 1983: Establishment of Tsukigata Prison Museum.

Climate

Agricultural Produce
 Rice, cut flowers, fruits (melons and watermelons)

Specialty Products
 Tsukigata flowers, Tsukigata melons, Tsukigata watermelons (Godzilla egg and Dynamite varieties), Tomato Juice, Tsukigata Jingis Khan (Lamb), Tsukigata Manju, Tsukigata tofu, Kabato tofu, etc.

Transport

Train
 Hokkaido Passenger Rail (JR Hokkaido): Gakuentoshi Line: Tsukigaoka Station, Chiraiotsu Station, Ishikari Tsukigata Station, Yutakaoka Station, Sappinai Station

Bus
 Hokkaido Chuo Bus: Bound for Iwamizawa Terminal via. Kitamura. 
 Shinshinotsu Bus: Bound for Shinshinotsu Village via. Ebetsu Station.

Taxi
 Haato Hire

Roads
 General Roads: National Highway 275 (Sorachi National Highway)
 Prefectural Roads: Hokkaido Route 6 Iwamizawa- Tsukigata;                    Hokkaido Route 11 Tsukigata- Atsuta;                    Hokkaido Route 33 Biei- Tsukigata;                    Hokkaido Route 275 Tsukigata- Minenobu;                    Hokkaido Route 376

Famous Places/Sightseeing Spots

Culture
 Tsukigata Prison Museum
 Record Diary of Hokkaido
 Sewage and Water Treatment

Sightseeing
 Kairaku Park 
 Tsukigata Hot Spring Resort
 Tsukigata Hot Spring Annexe
 Rural activities workshop Facilities
 People of Hokkaido Forests (Tsukigata Branch)
 Tsukigata Prison Museum

Culture

Mascot

He is a cheerful green melon who is a gardener and a glasses and bag salesman. He is 201 km high.

References

External links

Official Website 

Towns in Hokkaido